The Oshan COS1° (科赛) is a 7-seater mid-sized luxury crossover produced by Changan Automobile under the Oshan brand.

Overview

The Oshan COS1° debuted on the 2018 Beijing Auto Show and was launched on the Chinese auto market right after with prices ranging from 93,800 yuan to 145,800 yuan. The COS1° was branded under Oshan, Changan's affordable premium brand, a sub-brand that focuses on building passenger vehicles which was separated from the Oshang brand. Oshan was known for producing compact MPVs and crossovers, with the COS1° being the first product of the brand. 

The lone engine of the Oshan COS1° is a 1.5 liter turbo engine producing 178 horsepower (131kW) and 265 N-m.

Oshan COS1° GT
A sportier and more upmarket version of the Oshan COS1° was revealed during the 2019 Shanghai Auto Show called the Oshan COS1° GT. 
The Oshan COS1° GT features a slightly restyled front grilles and different front and rear bumpers.
The engine of the Oshan COS1° GT is a 2.0 liter turbo engine producing 233 horsepower and 360 N-m mated to a 8-speed automatic gearbox which is the same setup as the Changan CS85 Coupe.

References

External links
Oshan COS1° Official website 

Changan Automobile vehicles
Crossover sport utility vehicles
Cars of China
Cars introduced in 2018